My Daughter and I (German: Meine Tochter und ich) is a 1963 West German comedy film directed by Thomas Engel and starring Heinz Rühmann, Gustav Knuth and Gertraud Jesserer.

It was shot at the Bavaria Studios in Munich. The film's sets were designed by the art directors Rolf Zehetbauer and Herbert Strabel.

Cast
 Heinz Rühmann as Dr. Robert Stegemann
 Gustav Knuth as Dr. Walther
 Gertraud Jesserer as Biggi
 Eckart Dux as Jochen
 Agnes Windeck as Frau Winkler
 Herta Saal as Frau Brenner
 Christiane Nielsen as Marion
 Heinz Schubert as Detektiv

References

Bibliography 
 Körner, Torsten. Der kleine Mann als Star: Heinz Rühmann und seine Filme der 50er Jahre. Campus Verlag, 2001.

External links 
 

1963 films
West German films
German comedy films
1963 comedy films
1960s German-language films
Films directed by Thomas Engel
Gloria Film films
Films shot at Bavaria Studios
1960s German films